The Phantom of the Desert is a 1930 American western film directed by Harry S. Webb and starring Jack Perrin, Eva Novak and Josef Swickard.

Cast
 Jack Perrin as Jack Saunders
 Eva Novak as 	Mary Van Horn
 Josef Swickard as Colonel Van Horn
 Lila Eccles as Nora - the Cook
 Ben Corbett as 	Benny Mack
 Edward Earle as 	Dan Denton
 Robert Walker as 	Steve - Henchman
 Pete Morrison as Jim - Henchman
 Starlight the Horse as 	Phantom

References

Bibliography
 Pitts, Michael R. Western Movies: A Guide to 5,105 Feature Films. McFarland, 2012.

External links
 

1930 films
1930 Western (genre) films
1930s English-language films
American Western (genre) films
Films directed by Harry S. Webb
American black-and-white films
1930s American films